A list of British films released in 1926.

1926

See also
 1926 in British music
 1926 in film
 1926 in the United Kingdom

References

External links
 

1926
Films
British
1920s in British cinema